Rising Sun Tavern refers to the following historical taverns, all of which were roadhouses (stops for travelers and their horses) in the 18th and 19th centuries:
 The Rising Sun Tavern (North Haven, Connecticut), a roadhouse circa 1760 to circa 1860, now a private home
 The Rising Sun Tavern (Philadelphia), long a landmark on the Old York Road, no longer extant (Old York Road § Rising Sun Tavern (Philadelphia))
 The Rising Sun Tavern (Fredericksburg, Virginia), known in the 18th century as the Golden Eagle, now a historical interpretation site for visitors
 The Rising Sun Tavern, established circa 1720, at the place that later became named after it, Rising Sun, Maryland 
 The Rising Sun Tavern, established circa 1792, and the small village formerly around it and named after it, which was formerly adjacent to (and later part of) Gap, Pennsylvania

See also
 The House of the Rising Sun, a traditional folk song with a thematic element of a public house called the Rising Sun ("Lomax also noted that 'Rising Sun' was the name of a bawdy house in two traditional English songs, and a name for English pubs")